Qiaotou (Chinese: t , s , Qiáotóu, lit. "Bridgehead") may refer to the following places:

Mainland China
Towns
Qiaotou, Dongguan, Guangdong
Qiaotou, Yongjia County, Zhejiang
Hutiaoxia Town, formerly Qiaotou, Shangri-La County, Yunnan

Townships
Qiaotou Township, Shenze County, Hebei
Qiaotou Township, Baoding, in Yi County, Hebei

Taiwan
 Ciaotou District, Kaohsiung, Republic of China (Taiwan)